Events from the year 1983 in the United States.

Incumbents

Federal government 
 President: Ronald Reagan (R-California)
 Vice President: George H. W. Bush (R-Texas)
 Chief Justice: Warren E. Burger (Minnesota)
 Speaker of the House of Representatives: Tip O'Neill (D-Massachusetts)
 Senate Majority Leader: Howard Baker (R-Tennessee)
 Congress: 97th (until January 3), 98th (starting January 3)

Events

January
 January 1 – The New Jersey Transit Police Department is created in the state of New Jersey.
 January 2 – The musical Annie is performed for the last time after 2,377 shows at the Alvin Theatre on Broadway, New York City.
 January 3 – Kilauea begins slowly erupting on the Big Island of Hawaii. On December 5, 2018, after 90 days of inactivity from the volcano, the eruption that started in 1983 was declared to be over.
 January 18 – The International Olympic Committee restores Native American athlete Jim Thorpe's Olympic medals to his family.
 January 19 – Apple Inc. releases the Apple Lisa personal computer.
 January 25 – President Reagan delivers his second State of the Union Address to the 98th Congress.
 January 26 – Lotus 1-2-3 is released for IBM-PC compatible computers.
 January 30 – The Washington Redskins defeat the Miami Dolphins by a score of 27–17 in Super Bowl XVII.

February
 February 18 – Wah Mee massacre: 13 people are killed in an attempted robbery in Seattle, Washington.
 February 23 
The United States Environmental Protection Agency announces its intention to buy out and evacuate the dioxin-contaminated community of Times Beach, Missouri.
Failure of automatic shut-down at Salem Nuclear Power Plant, New Jersey, USA.
 February 24 – A special commission of the Congress of the United States releases a report critical of the practice of Japanese internment during World War II.
 February 28 – The final episode of M*A*S*H airs, setting a new record for most-watched television broadcast in American history.

March

 March 3 – Musician/TV host Peter Ivers is fatally bludgeoned by an intruder in his Los Angeles apartment. The perpetrator is never identified.
 March 8 – IBM releases the IBM PC XT.
 March 9 – Anne Burford resigns as head of the United States Environmental Protection Agency amid scandal.
 March 22 – Judith Neelley is convicted of the kidnap and murder of 13 year old Lisa Millican in Georgia and sentenced to death. Her sentence is later reduced to life imprisonment.
 March 23 – Strategic Defense Initiative: U.S. President Ronald Reagan makes his initial proposal to develop technology to intercept enemy missiles. The media dub this plan "Star Wars".
 March 25
 Motown celebrates its 25th anniversary with the television special Motown 25: Yesterday, Today, Forever, during which Michael Jackson performs Billie Jean and introduces the moonwalk.
Rob Lowe's film The Outsiders is released.

April
 April 11 – The 55th Academy Awards, hosted by Liza Minnelli, Dudley Moore, Richard Pryor and Walter Matthau, are held at Dorothy Chandler Pavilion in Los Angeles. Richard Attenborough's Gandhi receives 11 nominations and wins eight awards, including Best Picture and Best Director. Louis Gossett Jr. also becomes the first African-American actor to win Best Supporting Actor for his role in An Officer and a Gentleman.
 April 18
 The April 1983 U.S. Embassy bombing in Beirut kills 63 people.
 The Disney Channel is initiated on American cable TV.
 April 25 – Manchester, Maine schoolgirl Samantha Smith is invited to visit the Soviet Union by its leader Yuri Andropov, after he read her letter in which she expressed fears about nuclear war.

May
 May 2 – The 6.2  Coalinga earthquake shakes central California with a maximum Mercalli intensity of VIII (Severe), causing 94 injuries and $10 million in losses.
May 17 – Lebanon, Israel, and the United States sign an agreement on Israeli withdrawal from Lebanon.
May 22–31 – In the 1983 NBA Finals ("Showdown '83") the championship round of the 1982–83 NBA season, the Philadelphia 76ers defeat the Los Angeles Lakers 4–0. This is the last NBA Championship Series completed before June 1. Finals MVP – Moses Malone (Philadelphia 76ers).
 May 25
 National Missing Children's Day is proclaimed by President Ronald Reagan, exactly four years after Etan Patz's disappearance.
Return of the Jedi, the 3rd of the projected 12 Star Wars films produced by George Lucas, is released in the United States. The original Star Wars was released 6 years to the day previously on May 25, 1977.
 May 27 – Benton fireworks disaster: A powerful explosion at an unlicensed fireworks factory in Benton, Tennessee kills 11 and injures one. 
 May 28 – The 9th G7 summit begins in Williamsburg, Virginia.
May 29 
 Tom Sneva wins the Indianapolis 500 motor race
 Neil Bonnett wins the 24th running of the world 600 at Charlotte Motor Speedway.
May 31 – The Philadelphia 76ers defeat the LA Lakers to sweep the NBA championship in four games.

June
June – Throughout the local summer, many Midwestern American states are affected by a severe drought that causes water shortages.
 June 4 – Fugitive tax protester Gordon Kahl, who has been on the run for four months, is killed in a shootout with police in Smithville, Arkansas, along with a local sheriff.
 June 13 – Pioneer 10 becomes the first man-made object to leave the Solar System.
 June 16 – Cork Graham is caught off the Vietnamese island of Phú Quốc looking for treasure buried by Captain Kidd. He is convicted and imprisoned until 1984 for illegal entry.
 June 18 – STS-7: Sally Ride becomes the first American woman in space, on the Space Shuttle Challenger.

July
 July 7 – Samantha Smith flies to the Soviet Union (see April 25).
 July 23 – Diana Ross's concert at The Great Lawn of New York City's Central Park, attended by 800,000 fans, is cut short by a massive lightning storm. 
 July 25 – The world's first dedicated hospital ward for HIV/AIDS patients opens at San Francisco General Hospital.

August
 August 1 – America West Airlines begins operations in Phoenix, Arizona, and Las Vegas, Nevada.
 August 18 – Hurricane Alicia hits the Texas coast, killing 22 and causing over US$3.8 billion (2005 dollars) in damage.
 August 24 – The Philadelphia Arena is destroyed by arson.
 August 30 – STS-8: Space Shuttle Challenger carries Guion S. Bluford, the first African-American astronaut, into space.

September
 September 1 – Cold War: Korean Air Lines Flight 007 is shot down by a Soviet Union jet fighter when the commercial aircraft enters Soviet airspace. All 269 on board are killed, including U.S. Congressman Larry McDonald.
 September 5 – Tom Brokaw becomes lead anchor for NBC Nightly News.
 September 15 – Huey Lewis and the News's album Sports is released.
 September 16 – President Ronald Reagan announces that the Global Positioning System (GPS) will be made available for civilian use.
 September 17 – Vanessa Lynn Williams becomes the first African-American to be crowned Miss America, in Atlantic City, New Jersey.
 September 18 – U.S. heavy metal band Kiss officially appears in public without makeup for the first time on MTV.

October
 October 4
Richard Noble sets a new land speed record of 633.468 mph, driving Thrust 2 at the Black Rock Desert, Nevada.
The first Hooters restaurant opens in Clearwater, Florida.
 October 16 – World Series: The Baltimore Orioles defeat the Philadelphia Phillies 5–0 in Game 5, to win the series 4 games to 1 for their 3rd World Championship.
 October 23 – Simultaneous suicide truck-bombings destroy both the French and the United States Marine Corps barracks in Beirut, killing 241 U.S. servicemen, 58 French paratroopers and 6 Lebanese civilians.
 October 25 
United States troops invade Grenada at the behest of Eugenia Charles of Dominica, a member of the Organization of American States.
Microsoft Word is first released.
 October 28 – The 6.9  Borah Peak earthquake shook central Idaho with a maximum Mercalli intensity of IX (Violent), causing two deaths, three injuries, and $12.5 million in losses.

November
 November 2 
 Martin Luther King Jr. Day: At the White House Rose Garden, U.S. President Ronald Reagan signs a bill creating a federal holiday on the third Monday of every January to honor American civil rights leader Martin Luther King Jr. It is first observed in 1986.
Chrysler introduces the Dodge Caravan, the first "minivan".
 November 3 – The Reverend Jesse Jackson announces his candidacy for the 1984 Democratic Party presidential nomination.
November 7 – 1983 U.S. Senate bombing A bomb explodes in the United States Senate with the intent to kill Republican senators however nobody was killed. The perpetrators were part of the May 19th Communist Organization.
 November 10
 The anticancer drug etoposide is approved by the FDA, leading to a curative treatment regime in the field of combination chemotherapy of testicular carcinoma.
 Star 80 released: A film about the true story of Playboy Playmate of the Year Dorothy Stratten, who was murdered by her estranged husband Paul Snider on August 14, 1980.
 November 11 – Ronald Reagan becomes the first U.S. President to address the Diet, Japan's national legislature.
 November 13 – The first United States cruise missiles arrive at Greenham Common Airbase in England amid protests from peace campaigners.
 November 14 –  The immunosuppressant cyclosporine is approved by the FDA, leading to a revolution in the field of transplantation.
 November 16 – A jury in Gretna, Louisiana acquits Ginny Foat of the murder of Argentine businessman Moses Chaiyo.
 November 18 – A Christmas Story is released.

December
 December 2 – Michael Jackson's music video for "Thriller" is broadcast for the first time. It becomes the most often repeated and famous music video of all time, increasing his own popularity and record sales of the album Thriller.
 December 4 – ** United States Navy aviator Lt's. Mark Lange and Bobby Goodman are shot down in an A-6 Intruder over Lebanon and captured by Syrians; Lt. Lange dies of his injuries; Lt. Goodman is released 30 days later after the intervention of the Reverend Jesse Jackson.
 December 13 – The Denver Nuggets and the visiting Detroit Pistons combine for an NBA record 370 points, with Detroit winning in triple overtime, 186–184.
 December 24 – Miles City, Montana sets the record for the highest mean sea level pressure in the contiguous US with a reading of 31.42 inHg (1064 mb).
 December 27 – A propane explosion in Buffalo, New York kills five firefighters and two civilians.
 December 29 – The Reverend Jesse Jackson travels to Syria to secure the release of U.S. Navy Lieutenant Robert Goodman, who had been in Syrian captivity since being shot down over the country during a reconnaissance mission.
 December 31 – The Apple Macintosh television advertisement is released.

Undated
 McDonald's introduces the McNugget.
 The Drug Abuse Resistance Education (DARE) program is launched.
 The economy begins a robust recovery following the early 1980s recession.
 Flashdance and Return of the Jedi are box-office hits.
 Kellogg's introduces Crispix cereal.
 Kary Mullis discovers polymerase chain reaction while working for Cetus.
 Chrysler starts production on the first minivans: the Dodge Caravan and Plymouth Voyager.
 The Cabbage Patch Kids dolls make their national debut, their popularity leads to the Cabbage Patch riots.
 First Pentecostal Conference of North American Keralites is held in Oklahoma City, Oklahoma.
 A severe drought affects the Midwest, Great Plains and parts of the Southern United States between May and September.
 Kam Controls company is founded in Houston, Texas.
 Nutricia North America, a specialized medical nutrition company is founded.

Ongoing
 Cold War (1947–1991)

Sport
May 14 – Portland Winter Hawks become the First American team to win the Memorial Cup by defeating the Oshawa Generals 8 to 3. The Final game is played at Memorial Coliseum in Portland, Oregon

Births

January

 January 2
 Kate Bosworth, actress
 Anthony Carrigan, actor
 Ben Driebergen, Marine veteran and television personality
 Jesse Taylor, mixed martial artist
 January 4
 Patrick Aleph, singer/songwriter, writer, and rabbi
 Robbie Bina, ice hockey player
 Will Bynum, basketball player
 Spencer Chamberlain, singer/songwriter and frontman for Underoath
 January 5 – Sean Dockery, basketball player
 January 6
 Johnny Bedford, mixed martial artist
 Adam Burish, hockey player
 January 7
 Tosin Abasi, Nigerian-born musician for Animals As Leaders
 Brett Dalton, actor
 Natalie Gulbis, golfer
 Robert Ri'chard, actor
 January 8 – Chris Masters, wrestler and actor
 January 9
 Andy Barron, photographer
 Brandon Boggs, baseball player
 January 10 – Tom Gilbert, hockey player
 January 11
 Turner Battle, basketball player
 Sarah Blacker, singer/songwriter
 January 12 – Eleni Benson, American-born Greek footballer
 January 13 – Brianne Moncrief, actress
 January 14 – Rodney Billups, basketball player
 January 15 – Tim Andrews, stock car racing driver
 January 18 – Amir Blumenfeld, Israeli-born actor, comedian, television host, and writer
 January 19 – Meredith Andrews, Christian music artist and songwriter
 January 20
 Matt Albers, baseball player
 Georgina Bloomberg, equestrian, philanthropist, and owner of the equestrian team New York Empire
 January 21 – Alex Acker, American-born Italian basketball player
 January 22 – Shaun Cody, football player
 January 23
 Nick Antosca, writer, producer, and novelist
 J. J. Arrington, football player
 Eric Bassey, football player
 January 24
 Diane Birch, singer/songwriter
 Frankie Grande, actor, dancer, television personality, and producer
 Scott Speed, formula one driver
 January 25 – Brian Armstrong, business executive and CEO of Coinbase
 January 26 – Tyler August, politician
 January 27
 Deon Anderson, football player
 Nathan Dahm, politician
 Gavin Floyd, baseball player
 January 28
 Titus Adams, football player
 Daniel Davison, musician and drummer, co-founder of Norma Jean
 Brian Michael Smith, Actor
 January 30 – Derek Bloom, drummer for From First to Last
 January 31 – Elizabeth Armstrong, water polo player

February

 February 1
 Ronnie Kroell, fashion model, actor, and singer 
 Andrew VanWyngarden, singer/songwriter and guitarist
 February 3
 Richard Bartel, football player
 Hillary Scott, pornographic actress
 February 4 – Hannibal Buress, comedian
 February 5
 John Iadarola, left-wing pundit
 Vanessa Rousso, French-born poker player
 February 6
 Melrose Bickerstaff, financial advisor, fashion model, and fashion designer
 Michael Robinson, football player
 February 7 – Scott Feldman, baseball player 
 February 8
 Burke Badenhop, baseball player
 Jermaine Blackburn, basketball player
 Jim Verraros, singer and actor
 February 10
 Kenny Adeleke, Nigerian-born basketball player
 Chad Bartlomé, soccer player
 Vic Fuentes, singer/songwriter, guitarist, and frontman for Pierce the Veil
 Joe Sempolinski, politician
 February 11 – Victor Adeyanju, football player
 February 13
 Klayton Adams, football player and coach
 Luke Barnett, actor, writer, and producer
 February 14 – Julia Ling,  actress
 February 15
 Nathan Ball, basketball player
 Eddie Basden, basketball player
 Elijah Behnke, politician
 February 16
 Benjamin Benditson, soccer player
 John Magaro, actor
 February 17
 Mark Arabo, human rights activist
 Kevin Rudolf, singer/songwriter and record producer
 February 18
 Troy Bienemann, football player
 Jason Maxiell, basketball player
 Wrenn Schmidt, actress
 February 19
 Dan Barry, wrestler
 Brad Kilby, baseball player
 Ryan Whitney, hockey player
 Jawad Williams, basketball player
 February 20
 Kayla Bashore Smedley, field hockey player
 Justin Verlander, baseball player
 February 22
 Ytai Abougzir, Israeli-born tennis player
 Carlos Fisher, baseball player
 Iliza Shlesinger, comedian
 February 23 – Aziz Ansari, comedian and actor
 February 24 – Matt McGinley, drummer for Gym Class Heroes
 February 27
 Taye Biddle, football player
 Chaim Bloom, sports executive and Chief Baseball Officer for the Boston Red Sox
 Devin Harris, basketball player
 Kate Mara, actress
 February 28 – Linda Király, American-born Hungarian singer/songwriter

March

 March 1 – Sam Bishop, soccer player
 March 2 – Adam Conover, comedian, writer, voice actor, and television host
 March 3 – Brent Almond, producer
 March 4 – Jessica Heap, actress
 March 5
 Marvin Allen, English-born football player
 Torben Bernhard, filmmaker and rap artist
 March 7
 Raquel Alessi, actress
 Steven B. Grant, politician
 Taylor Tankersley, baseball player
 March 9
 Bobby Campo, actor
 Clint Dempsey, soccer player
 March 10
 Janet Mock, author and activist
 Carrie Underwood, country singer
 March 11 – Melissa Rycroft, television personality and reality television contestant
 March 12 – Todd Bates, football player and coach
 March 14 – Taylor Hanson, singer and keyboard player for Hanson
 March 15 – Peter Atencio, director
 March 16
 Kevin Bookout, basketball player
 Jon-Michael Ecker, actor
 Stephanie Gatschet, actress
 March 17
 Atit Shah, producer
 Timothy Thatcher, wrestler
 March 18
 Bradley Bell, keyboardist for Chiodos
 Kyle Downes, actor
 Brendan Schaub, mixed martial artist
 March 19
 Matt McJunkins, bassist and vocalist for A Perfect Circle
 Nicole Muirbrook, actress and model
 Matt Sydal, wrestler
 March 20
 Patrick Afif, football player
 Michael Cassidy, actor
 March 21 – Clint Ingram, football player
 March 23 – Patrick Beilein, basketball player and coach
 March 27 – Shawntinice Polk, basketball player (d. 2005)
 March 29
 Anthony Armstrong, football player
 Donald Cerrone, mixed martial artist
 Chokwe Antar Lumumba, politician, mayor of Jackson, Mississippi
 March 30
 Annie Bersagel, long-distance runner and lawyer
 Zach Gowen, wrestler
 March 31 – Melissa Ordway, actress and model

April

 April 1
 Jacob Appelbaum, journalist, computer security researcher, artist, and hacker
 Matt Lanter, actor and model
 Sean Taylor, football player (d. 2007)
 April 2 – Yung Joc, rapper
 April 3 – Errol Barnett, British-born news anchor and journalist
 April 4
 Eric André, comedian, actor, and television host
 Charles Bennett, football player
 Amanda Righetti, actress
 April 5 – Phil Bolton, rugby player
 April 6
 Artosis, esports commentator and Twitch streamer
 Diora Baird, actress
 Jeremy Bolm, singer and frontman for Touché Amoré
 Bobbi Starr, pornographic actress
 April 7 – Veronica Alvarez, baseball player
 April 9
 Devin Barclay, football player
 Donovan Richards, politician
 April 10
 Gabriel Arana, journalist
 Janelle Asselin, comic book editor and writer
 Sherman Austin, anarchist and musician
 Jamie Chung, actress and reality star
 Ryan Merriman, actor
 April 12
 Rufus Alexander, football player
 Judy Marte, actress and producer
 April 13 – Jay Bezel, rapper
 April 14
 Jon Bernad, artist and producer
 Jeff Fiorentino, baseball player
 April 15
 Colin Allred, politician and football player
 Blu, rapper and record producer
 April 17 – Guy Reschenthaler, politician
 April 18 – Jordan Beck, football player
 April 19 – Joe Mauer, baseball player
 April 20
 Jason Avant, football player
 Alison Bartosik, Olympic swimmer
 Benjah, songwriter and producer
 April 21
 Dario Hunter, rabbi, lawyer and politician
 Tarvaris Jackson, football player 
 April 22
 Remi Ayodele, football player
 Francis Capra, actor  
 Matt Jones, football player 
 April 23
 Mike Bell, football player
 Carl Higbie, Navy SEAL, author, and political commentator
 Aaron Hill, actor
 April 24
 Madeline Ashby, American-born Canadian science fiction writer
 Daniel Barone, baseball player
 Will Champlin, singer/songwriter
 Alexis Ohanian, internet entrepreneur, investor, and co-founder of Reddit
 April 26 – Adam Gregg, politician, 47 Lieutenant Governor of Iowa
 April 27
 Corey Harrison, businessman and reality star
 Greg Miller, media personality
 April 28
 Emily Azevedo, bobsledder
 Julia Bachison, beauty pageant titleholder
 Sam Jones III, actor
 April 29
 Megan Boone, actress
 Jay Cutler, football player
 Sam Jones III, actor
 David Lee, basketball player
 April 30 – Stevie Aiello, songwriter, musician, and record producer

May

 May 3
 Joseph Addai, football player
 Brian Alexander, water polo player
 Ari Magder, actor (d. 2012)
 May 4 – Brad Bufanda, actor (d. 2017)
 May 6
 Seyi Abolaji, Nigerian-born soccer player
 Reid W. Barton, mathematician
 Adrianne Palicki, actress
 Doron Perkins, basketball player
 Gabourey Sidibe, actress
 May 8 – Florent Groberg, French-born U.S. Army veteran in the Afghan War and Medal of Honor recipient
 May 9 – Tyler Lumsden, baseball player
 May 10 – Chad Barefoot, politician
 May 11
 Matt Baker, football player and coach
 Brett Basanez, football player
 Daizee Haze, wrestler
 Shannon M. Kent, United States Navy Senior Chief Petty Officer and cryptologic technician, killed in the 2019 Manbij bombing (d. 2019)
 Matt Leinart, football player
 May 12 – Brett Wiesner, soccer player (d. 2014)
 May 13 – Tim Brennan, guitarist for Dropkick Murphys
 May 14 – Amber Tamblyn, actress
 May 15
 The Kid Mero, media personality
 Clint Sammons, baseball player
 Michael Schlossberg, politician
 May 17
 Jayson Blair, actor
 Channing Frye, basketball player
 May 18 – Michael Behenna, U.S. Army Lieutenant
 May 19 – Adam Schindler, mixed martial artist
 May 20 – Michaela McManus, actress
 May 21 – Leva Bates, wrestler
 May 22
 John Hopkins, MotoGP racer
 Jordan Mancino, drummer for As I Lay Dying
 May 23
 Federico Bianchi, soccer player
 Jordan Mancino, drummer for Wovenwar
 Josh Pace, basketball player
 Alex Shelley, wrestler
 May 26
 Mark Anderson, football player
 Pat Grassley, politician
 May 27 – Bobby Convey, soccer player
 May 28
 Active Child, singer/songwriter and record producer
 Jay Alford, football player
 Roman Atwood, YouTuber and prankster
 Megalyn Echikunwoke, actress
 Aaron Rosa, mixed martial artist
 Cory Wade, baseball player
 May 30
 Duane Bastress, mixed martial artist
 Darryl Blackstock, football player
 May 31
 Lorenzo Alexander, football player
 David Hernandez, singer
 Michael Lynche, singer

June

 June 1 – Phillip Alexander, football player
 June 2
 Delia Ramirez, politician
 Brooke White, singer
 June 4 – Jon Alston, football player, film director, screenwriter and film producer
 June 5
 Jason Bedrick, politician
 Bill Bray, baseball player
 June 6
 Adam Hendershott, actor
 Kellen Clemens, football player
 June 7
 Saad Awad, mixed martial artist
 Ryan Bader, mixed martial artist
 Indiggo, Romanian-born twin sisters, singer-songwriters and reality TV personalities
 Mark Lowe, baseball player
 Pierre Pierce, basketball player
 June 8 – Gaines Adams, football player (d. 2010)
 June 9
 Andrew Bachman, entrepreneur and investor
 Justin Benson, director, writer, actor, editor, and producer
 Rafi Fine, co-founder of React Media, LLC
 June 10
 Nick Adams, actor, singer, and dancer
 Marion Barber III, football player (d. 2022)
 Chase Blackburn, football player
 Shanna Collins, actress
 Jason Evigan, musician, singer/songwriter, and record producer
 Leelee Sobieski, actress
 June 11
 2 Pistols, rapper
 Grant Achilles, basketball player
 Justin Allgood, football player
 Justin Shekoski, songwriter, vocalist, and guitarist for Saosin (2003–2015) and The Used (2015–2018)
 June 13 – David Begnaud, journalist and news correspondent
 June 15 – Derek Anderson, football player
 June 16
 Manish Dayal, actor
 Olivia Hack, actress and voice actress
 June 19
 Josh Appelt, mixed martial artist
 Emanuel Ayvas, singer and frontman for Emanuel and the Fear
 Jason Capizzi, football player
 Macklemore, rapper
 June 20
 Patrisse Cullors, activist
 Darren Sproles, football player
 June 21
 Michael Malarkey, Lebanese-born British-American actor and musician
 Brian Sites, actor 
 Edward Snowden, government whistleblower
 June 22 – Miles Fisher, actor and musician  
 June 23
 Ini Archibong, artist and designer
 Miles Fisher, actor, comedian, entrepreneur and musician
 Kathreen Khavari, actress, writer and producer
 Brandi Rhodes, wrestler and reality television personality
 June 24
 Brandon Saller, drummer and vocalist for Atreyu
 Haley Stevens, politician
 June 27
 Mickey Bey, boxer
 Ernest Chavez, mixed martial artist
 Ashley Hinson, politician
 June 28
 Brianne Berkson, actress, comedian, and producer
 Curtis Lepore, actor, musician and internet celebrity 
 June 29 – Paul Appleby, operatic tenor
 June 30
 Nicholas Arciniaga, long distance runner
 Blas Avena, mixed martial artist (d. 2016)
 Josh Beekman, football player
 Heath Benedict, Dutch-born football player (d. 2008)
 Cole Swindell, singer

July

 July 1
 Audrey Assad, singer/songwriter
 Lynsey Bartilson, actress, dancer, and singer
 Tanya Chisholm, actress and dancer
 July 2
 Michelle Branch, singer/songwriter
 Alicia Menendez, television commentator
 July 5
 Jason Allen, football player
 James Edson Berto, mixed martial artist
 July 7 – Kristi Capel, beauty pageant and news presenter
 July 8
 Ana Ayora, actress
 DeVaughn Nixon, actor
 July 9
 Christina Hall, real estate investor and TV personality
 Christopher Porco, convicted murderer
 July 11 – Joel Salinas, American-born Nicaraguan neurologist, writer, and researcher
 July 12
 Jason William Adams, actor
 Howie Kendrick, baseball player
 July 14 – Graham Ackerman, gymnast
 July 15
 Hiro Murai, Japanese-born filmmaker
 Yuh-Line Niou, Taiwanese-born politician
 Heath Slater, wrestler
 July 16 – Philando Castile, African-American killed by police
 July 17 – Nick Moore, frontman for Before Their Eyes
 July 18
 Jennifer Berry, beauty pageant titleholder and Miss America 2006
 Aaron Gillespie, singer and musician for Underoath
 Dan McCready, veteran, entrepreneur, civil rights activist, and political candidate
 July 19
 Gloria Almonte, beauty pageant titleholder
 Trai Byers, actor and singer
 Willie Byrd, football player
 July 20 – Dan Book, songwriter and producer
 July 21
 Bizzle, Christian hip hop artist
 Wes Felix, sprinter
 Kellen Winslow II, football player
 July 22
 Jenni Barber, actress and singer
 Dan Bazuin, football player
 Seth Magaziner, politician
 July 23
 Aaron Peirsol, Olympic swimmer
 July 24
 Collin Ashton, football player
 Joey Kovar, model and television personality (d. 2012)
 July 26
 Kim Taylor Bennett, American-born British journalist and television presenter
 Albert Bimper, football player and athletic director
 Kate Bolduan, television journalist and CNN anchor
 Elettra Weidemann, fashion model and socialite
 July 27
 Joseph Boncore, politician
 Lauren Murphy, mixed martial artist
 Blair Redford, actor
 July 28
 David Anderson, football player
 Steve Baylark, football player
 Noah Robertson, drummer
 July 29
 Kaitlyn Black, actress
 Tania Gunadi, Indonesian-born actress and producer
 Elise Testone, singer/songwriter

August

 August 3 – Mamie Gummer, actress
 August 4
 Beth Bombara, singer/songwriter and musician
 Greta Gerwig, actress and filmmaker
 August 5 – Aaron Alafa, boxer
 August 6
 C. J. Mosley, football player
 Landon Pigg, singer/songwriter and actor
 August 7 – Brit Marling, actress, screenwriter and producer
 August 8 – Fred Meyers, actor
 August 9
 Terry Adams, BMX bicyclist
 Ashley Johnson, actress and voice actress
 August 10
 Tone Bell, comedian and actor
 C.B. Dollaway, mixed martial artist
 Spencer Redford, actress
 August 11
 Drumma Boy, rapper and record producer
 Joe Pinion, entrepreneur, television host, and political candidate
 August 14
 Black Milk, rapper, songwriter, and record producer
 Jon Hoadley, politician
 Mila Kunis, Ukrainian-born actress
 Spencer Pratt, television personality
 August 15 – Sean Feucht, Christian singer/songwriter, former worship leader at Bethel Church, and founder of the Let Us Worship movement
 August 16 – Colt Brennan, football player (died 2021)
 August 17
 Vance Aloupis, politician
 Dustin Pedroia, baseball player
 August 18 – Rex Richardson, politician, mayor of Long Beach, California
 August 19 
 Danny Baggish, Guamanian-born darts player
 John McCargo, American football player
 Mike Moh, actor and martial artist
 August 20
 Hamza Abdullah, football player
 Andrew Garfield, British-born actor
 August 21 – Brody Jenner, television personality
 August 23
 Vada Azeem, author, illustrator, and songwriter
 J. C. Bailey, wrestler (d. 2010)
 Annie Ilonzeh, actress
 August 24
 Brett Gardner, baseball player
 Tino Sabbatelli, wrestler
 August 25
 Hanif Abdurraqib, poet, essayist, and cultural critic
 Andrew Aydin, comic writer and political aide
 August 26 – Rob Cantor, singer/songwriter
 August 27 – Amir Sadollah, professional mixed martial artist
 August 28
 Baby Boy da Prince, rapper
 Kimberly Kane, actress
 Nate Washington, football player
 August 29 – Jennifer Landon, actress
 August 30
 David Banks, Olympic rower
 Jim Miller, mixed martial artist
 August 31
 Larry Fitzgerald, football player
 Devan Chandler Long, actor

September

 September 1 – Camille Mana, actress
 September 2
 Lester Abram, basketball player
 Jenny Berrigan, Deaflympic snowboarder
 Tiffany Hines, actress and singer
 September 3
 Adam Bergen, football player
 Christine Woods, actress
 September 4 – Landis Blair, illustrator and comics artist
 September 5 – Lincoln Riley, football coach
 September 6 – Jerry Blevins, baseball player
 September 7 – Andre Berto, boxer
 September 8 – Will Blalock, basketball player
 September 9
 Michael Allan, football player
 Jason Benetti, sportscaster
 Zoe Kazan, actress and screenwriter
 Aryn Michelle, Christian musician and songwriter
 September 10
 Shawn James, Guyanese-born basketball player
 Sarah Schneider, writer, actress, and comedian
 September 12
 Nicholas Barton, director, producer, screenwriter, editor, and cinematographer
 Johny Hendricks, mixed martial artist
 Trey Hollingsworth, politician
 Carly Smithson, singer
 September 15 – Holly Montag, television personality
 September 17 – Jennifer Peña, singer
 September 19
 Omar Elba, Egyptian-born actor
 Joey Devine, baseball player
 Charlie Haeger, baseball player
 September 20
 Rick DeJesus, singer/songwriter and frontman for Adelitas Way
 Yuna Ito, American-born Japanese singer and actress
 Doug Thomas, basketball player
 September 21
 Scott Evans, actor
 Maggie Grace, actress
 Joseph Mazzello, actor
 September 23
 Jason Lancaster, singer/songwriter
 David Lim, actor
 Shane del Rosario, mixed martial artist and kickboxer (died 2013)
 September 24 – Randy Foye, basketball player
 September 25 – Donald Glover, actor and singer/songwriter
 September 26
 James Anderson, football player
 Zoe Perry, actress
 September 27
 Amelia Boone, obstacle racer and lawyer
 Shannon Lucas, drummer for All That Remains (2006) and The Black Dahlia Murder (2007–2012)
 September 28
 Mike Balogun, boxer
 Julissa Bermudez, Dominican-born television personality and actress
 Summer Rae, wrestler and model
 Sarah Wright, actress
 September 29 – Marcel Rodríguez-López, keyboardist and percussionist for The Mars Volta and drummer for Zechs Marquise

October

 October 1 – Jackie Battle, football player
 October 2
 Prakash Amritraj, American-born Indian tennis player
 Gerran Walker, football player
 October 3
 Mikey Batts, wrestler
 Olga Bell, Russian-born musician, music producer, composer, and singer/songwriter
 Tessa Thompson, actress
 October 5
 Jesse Eisenberg, actor
 Shelby Rabara, actress and singer
 Nicky Hilton Rothschild, model and socialite
 October 6 – Larry Birdine, football player
 October 7 – Flying Lotus, musician  
 October 9 – Spencer Grammer, actress
 October 10 – Lzzy Hale, singer/songwriter, musician, lead vocalist and guitarist for Halestorm
 October 13 – Kamerion Wimbley, football player
 October 14 – Robert James Miller, U.S. Army veteran and Medal of Honor recipient (d. 2008)
 October 15 – Chris Barclay, football player
 October 16
 Ryan Blaum, golfer
 Brad Boles, politician
 October 17 – Daniel Booko, actor and model
 October 19 – Cara Santa Maria, neuroscientist and writer
 October 20 – Ryan Quarles, politician
 October 21
 Amber Rose, model and actress
 Aaron Tveit, actor
 October 23 – Adrienne Bailon, singer, actress, and television personality
 October 24
 Adrienne Bailon, singer and actress
 Brian Vickers, race car driver
 October 25 – Adrian Awasom, football player
 October 27 – Katy Tur, broadcast journalist
 October 29 – Johnny Lewis, actor (d. 2012)
 October 30 – Brandon Archer, football player

November

 November 2 – Willie Andrews, football player
 November 3 – Julie Marie Berman, actress
 November 8 – Kathleen Bertko, Olympic rower
 November 7
 Adam DeVine, actor, voice actor, comedian, screenwriter, producer, and singer
 Zach Myers, guitarist for Shinedown and frontman for The Fairwell
 November 9
 Rashad Anderson, basketball player
 Tony Barnette, baseball player
 Natalie Bible', director, screenwriter, editor, and producer
 Mattie Parker, politician, mayor of Fort Worth, Texas
 November 10 – Miranda Lambert, country singer
 November 11
 Nick Ahrens, designer and art director
 Kristal Marshall, wrestler, model, and beauty queen
 November 13 – Nick Albertson, artist
 November 14 – Chelsea Wolfe, singer/songwriter and musician
 November 15 – Tramaine Billie, football player
 November 16 – Benson Henderson, mixed martial artist
 November 17
 Ryan Bradley, figure skater
 Ryan Braun, baseball player
 Shannan Click, model
 Nick Markakis, baseball player
 Patrick McHale, animator
 Christopher Paolini, author
 Rocsi, television personality
 November 18 – Frank Scott Jr., politician, mayor of Little Rock, Arkansas
 November 19
 Varuzhan Akobian, Armenian-born chess grandmaster
 Adam Driver, actor
 DeAngelo Hall, football player
 November 20
 Andy Alleman, football player
 Future, rapper and singer/songwriter
 November 21 – The Bella Twins, (Brie & Nikki), wrestling duo
 November 22
 Lawson Aschenbach, racing driver
 Corey Beaulieu, guitarist for Trivium
 Tyler Hilton, singer/songwriter and actor
 November 23 – Wes Bankston, baseball player
 November 24
 Adam22, YouTuber and podcaster
 DJ Skee, DJ and producer
 Quentin Williams, politician (d. 2023)
 November 27
 Jason Berken, baseball player
 Arjay Smith, actor
 Donta Smith, basketball player
 Marco Thomas, football player
 November 28 – Tyler Glenn, singer/songwriter and frontman for Neon Trees
 November 29
 Pamela Brown, CNN justice correspondent 
 Jenn Sterger, television personality and model 
 November 30
 Chad Ackerman, rock singer/songwriter, musician, writer, director, actor, and producer
 Jermaine Allen, English-born football player
 CJ Gibson, actress and model
 Nicholas Kole, figure skater

December

 December 1 – Noelle Bassi, swimmer
 December 2
 Mistie Bass, basketball player
 Action Bronson, rapper, chef and television presenter
 Jana Kramer, actress
 Aaron Rodgers, football player
 Daniela Ruah, actress
 December 3 – Troy Bergeron, football player
 December 7 – Kenney Bertz, soccer player
 December 8
 Utkarsh Ambudkar, actor, rapper, and singer
 Ana Victoria, singer/songwriter, dancer, and record producer
 December 10
 Ashley Bouder, ballerina
 Patrick Flueger, actor
 December 13 – Satya Bhabha, English-born acor
 December 15
 Tanner Ainge, businessman and politician
 Ronnie Radke, singer/songwriter, rapper, and frontman for Falling in Reverse
 December 16
 Kelenna Azubuike, English-born basketball player
 Brandon Beal, singer/songwriter and producer
 December 17 – John Cholish, mixed martial artist
 December 18
 Melissa Arnot, mountaineer
 Ady Barkan, lawyer and political activist
 December 19
 Mark Baumer, writer, adventurer, and environmental activist (d. 2017)
 Casey Crescenzo, singer/songwriter and guitarist for The Dear Hunter and The Receiving End of Sirens  
 AJ Lamas, actor 
 December 20
 Gia Allemand, actress, model, and reality television contestant (d. 2013)
 Justin Blalock, football player
 Jonah Hill, actor
 December 21
 Taylor Teagarden, baseball player
 Steven Yeun, South Korean-born actor
 December 20 – Josh Sussman, actor
 December 27 – Cole Hamels, baseball player
 December 29 – Jessica Andrews, country singer
 December 30 – Ashley Zukerman, Australian-born actor
 December 31 – Fred Bennett, football player

Date Unknown

 Tiphany Adams, reality television personality, actress, model, and speaker
 Roma Agrawal, Indian-born British-American structural engineer
 Apryl A. Alexander, forensic psychologist and college professor
 Lucy Alibar, screenwriter and playwright
 Joseph Altuzarra, French-born designer
 Kyle Patrick Alvarez, director and screenwriter
 Phil America, artist
 Celia Ammerman, fashion model
 Evan Amos, video gaming photographer
 Lucia Aniello, Italian-born director, writer, and producer
 Nava Applebaum, Israeli-born murder victim of a Palestinian suicide bombing (d. 2003)
 Alexander Assefa, politician
 Yahya al-Bahrumi, terrorist (d. 2017)
 Baiyu, Chinese-born singer/songwriter and actress
 Jordan Baker-Caldwell, artist
 Sasha Baker, policy advisor, political scientist, and United States National Security Council staffer
 Nathan Ball, mechanical engineer, entrepreneur, TV host, children's author, pole vaulter, and beatboxer
 Justin Barr, internet entrepreneur and co-founder of TapIt
 Derrick Barry, drag performer
 Morgan Bassichis, comedian and writer
 Eleanor Bauer, choreographer and dancer
 Alexandra Bell, artist
 Alexander Benard, investor and lawyer
 Rebecca Bennett, brewmaster
 Berner, rapper
 Liz Berry, politician
 Adam Bilzerian, American-born Nevisian poker player and writer
 Beau Black, composer, producer, musician, singer/songwriter, and instrumentalist
 Blak Jak, rapper
 Charles Blake, politician
 Nathan Blecharczyk, businessman and co-founder of Airbnb
 Benjamin Boas, author, translator, and contemporary Japanese culture consultant
 Kyle Boddy, baseball coach and trainer
 Gregory Bonsignore, playwright, novelist, and actor
 Zachary Booth, actor
 Mat Bruso, singer and frontman for Bury Your Dead
 Katie Button, chef and restauranteur
 Danny Dias, television personality (d. 2017)
 Jesse Luken, actor
 Ashley Austin Morris, actress
 Brook Roberts, television personality and beauty pageant winner
 Anita Sarkeesian, Canadian-American feminist

Deaths

 January 2 – Edward Howard, Roman Catholic prelate and venerable (b. 1877)
 January 7 – Fred Church, actor (b. 1889)
 January 8  
 Tom McCall, journalist and politician, 30th Governor of Oregon (b. 1913)
 Gale Page, radio and screen actress (b. 1910)
 January 10 – Roy DeMeo, Mafia hitman (b. 1942)
 February 4 – Karen Carpenter, pop singer and drummer (b. 1950)
 March 18 – Catherine Marshall, author (b. 1914)
 April 15 – John Engstead, photographer and journalist (b. 1909)
 April 26 – Henrietta Buckmaster, activist, journalist and author (b. 1909)
 April 30
 George Balanchine, ballet dancer and choreographer (b. 1904 in Russia)
 Joel Henry Hildebrand, physical chemist (b. 1881)
 Muddy Waters, blues singer-songwriter (b. 1915)
 June 12 – Norma Shearer, Canadian-born actress (b. 1902 in Canada)
 June 23 – Glen Harmeson, American football player and coach (b. 1908)
 June 30 – Leonard B. Jordan, U.S. Senator from Idaho from 1962 to 1973 (b. 1899)
 July 1 – Buckminster Fuller, architect (b. 1895)
 August 7 – David Ford, actor (b. 1925)
 August 13 – Bob Bailey, actor (b. 1913)
 August 27 
 Harry A. deButts, railroad executive
 Bobby Griffith, suicide (b. 1963)
 September 1 
 Henry M. Jackson, U.S. Senator from Washington from 1953 to 1983 (b. 1912)
 Larry McDonald, U.S. Representative from Georgia from 1975 to 1983 (b. 1935)
 October 7 – George O. Abell, American astronomer, professor at UCLA, science popularizer, and skeptic (b. 1927)
 October 18 – Willie Jones, baseball player (b. 1925)
 October 23 – Jessica Savitch, journalist (b. 1947)
 November 8 – Robert Agnew, actor (b. 1899)
 November 13 – Junior Samples, comedian (b. 1926)
 December 21 – Rod Cameron, actor (b. 1910)
 December 27
 William Demarest, actor (b. 1892)
 Walter Scott, performer (b. 1943)

See also 
 1983 in American television
 List of American films of 1983
 Timeline of United States history (1970–1989)

References

External links
 

 
1980s in the United States
United States
United States
Years of the 20th century in the United States